The non-marine molluscs of South Korea are a part of the molluscan fauna of South Korea (wildlife of South Korea, environment of South Korea).

A number of species of non-marine molluscs are found in the wild in South Korea.

For example, there are 87 non-marine molluscs on Jeju Island

Freshwater gastropods 

Semisulcospiridae
 Semisulcospira libertina (Gould, 1859)

Lymnaeidae
 Austropeplea ollula (Gould, 1859)
 Galba truncatula (O. F. Müller, 1774)
 Radix auricularia (Linnaeus, 1758)

Physidae
 Physella acuta (Draparnaud, 1805)

Planorbidae
 Gyraulus convexiusculus Hutton, 1849
 Polypylis hemisphaerula (Benson, 1842)
 Hippeutis cantori (Benson, 1850)

Land gastropods 
Land gastropods in South Korea include:

Hydrocenidae
 Georissa japonica Pilsbry, 1900

Cyclophoridae
 Cyclophorus herklotsi von Martens, 1861
 Platyraphe minutus quelpartensis (Pilsbry & Hirase, 1908)
 Cyclotus campanulatus von Martens, 1865
 Nakadaella micron (Pilsbry, 1900)
 Spirostoma japonicum japonicum (A. Adams, 1867)
 Chamalycaeus kurodai (Pilsbry & Hirase, 1908)
 Chamalycaeus hirasei (Pilsbry, 1900)
 Chamalycaeus cyclophoroides (Pilsbry & Hirase, 1909)
 Nobuea elegantistriata Kuroda & Miyanaga, 1943
 Nobuea sp. of Kimura & Noseworthy (2020)

Pupinidae
 Pupinella rufa (Sowerby, 1864)

Diplommatinidae
 Arinia chejuensis Kwon & Lee, 1991
 Palaina pusilla (von Martens, 1877)
 Diplommatina paxillus (Gredler, 1881)
 Diplommatina changensis (Kwon & Lee, 1991)
 Diplommatina chejuensis (Kwon & Lee, 1991)
 Diplommatina tyosenica Kuroda & Miyanaga, 1939
 Diplommatina kyobuntoensis Kuroda & Miyanaga, 1943

Assimineidae

 Paludinellassiminea japonica (Pilsbry, 1901)
 Paludinellassiminea stricta  (Gould, 1859)
 Paludinellassiminea tanegashimae (Pilsbry, 1924)

Ellobiidae
 Allochroa layardi (H. Adams & A. Adams, 1855)
 Ellobium chinense (Pfeiffer, 1864)
 Laemodonta monilifera (H. Adams & A. Adams, 1854)
 Laemodonta exaratoides Kawabe, 1992
 Laemodonta octanfracta (Jonas, 1845)
 Laemodonta siamensis (Morelet, 1875)
 Microtralia acteocinoides Kuroda & Habe in Habe, 1961
 Melampus nuxcastaneus Kuroda, 1949
 Melampus fasciatus (Deshayes, 1830)
 Melampus taeniolus Hombron & Jaquinot, 1854

Carychiidae
 Carychium noduliferum Reinhardt, 1877
 Carychium pessimum Pilsbry, 1902
 Koreozospeum nodongense Lee, Prozorova & Jochum, 2015
Rathouisiidae

 Rathouisiidae sp. of Kimura et al. (2020)

Subulinidae
Allopeas clavulinum (Potiez & Michaud, 1838)
Allopeas clavulinum pyrgula (Schmacker & Boettger, 1891)
Allopeas clavulinum kyotense (Pilsbry & Hirase, 1904)

Diapheridae
Sinoennea iwakawa (Pilsbry, 1900)
 Sinoennea cave (Pilsbry & Hirase, 1908)

Succineidae
Oxyloma hirasei (Pilsbry, 1901)
 Neosuccinea horticola koreana Pilsbry, 1926

Cochlicopidae

 Cochlicopa lubrica (Müller, 1774)

Gastrocoptidae

 Gastrocopta armigerella (Reinhardt, 1877)
 Gastrocopta coreana (Pilsbry, 1916)
 Gastrocopta jinjiroi Kuroda & Hukuda, 1944

Vertiginidae

 Vertigo japonica coreana Pilsbry, 1919
 Vertigo alpestris uturyotoensis Kuroda & Hukuda, 1944

Pupillidae

 Pupilla cryptodon (Heude, 1880)

Pyramidulidae

 Pyramidula micra Pilsbry, 1926
 Pyramidula kobayashii Kuroda & Hukuda, 1944

Valloniidae
Vallonia costata (O. F. Müller, 1774)
 Zoogenetes harpa (Say, 1824)
 Zoogenetes tyosenica Kuroda & Hukuda, 1944

Strobilopsidae
 Eostrobilops hirasei (Pilsbry, 1908)
 Eostrobilops coreana (Pilsbry, 1926–1927)

Truncatellinidae

 Columella edentula (Draparnaud, 1805)

Enidae
Ena coreanica Pilsbry & Hirase, 1908
 Mirus junensis Kwon & Lee, 1991

Clausiliidae
 Euphaedusa fusaniana (Pilsbry & Hirase, 1908)
 Euphaedusa fusaniana uturyotoensis Kuroda & Hukuda, 1944
 Euphaedusa aculus coreana (Möllendorff, 1887)
 Euphaedusa aculus mokpoensis (Pilsbry & Hirase, 1908)
 Euphaedusa gottschei (Möllendorff, 1887)
 Euphaedusa hukudai (Kuroda & Miyanaga, 1943)
 Reinia variegata (Adams, 1868)
 Reinia sieboldtii insularis (Kuroda & Hukuda, 1944)
 Zaptyx miyanagai (Kuroda, 1936)
 Zaptyx miyanagai ullundoensis (Kwon & Lee, 1991)

Helicarionidae
 Trochochlamys crenulata (Gude, 1900)
 Gastrodontella stenogyra (A. Adams, 1868)
 Yamatochlamys lampra (Pilsbry & Hirase, 1904)
 Bekkochlamys subrejecta (Pilsbry & Hirase in Hirase, 1908)
 Bekkochlamys quelpartensis (Pilsbry & Hirase, 1908)
 Nipponochlamys fusanus (Hirase, 1908)
Nipponochlamys hypostilbe (Pilsbry & Hirase, 1909)
Otesiopsis sp. of Kimura et al. (2019)

Euconulidae

 Coneuplecta circumcincta (Reinhardt, 1883)
 Coneuplecta japonica (Kuroda & Miyanaga, 1943)
 Coneuplecta chejuensis (Kwon & Lee, 1991)
 Parasitala miyanagai (Kuroda & Hukuda, 1944)
 Discoconulus sinapidium (Reinhardt, 1877)

Limacidae
 Limax flavus Linnaeus, 1758
 Lehmannia marginata (O. F. Müller, 1774)

Agriolimacidae
 Deroceras reticulatum (Müller, 1774)

Philomycidae
Meghimatium bilineatum (Benson, 1842)
Meghimatium fruhstorferi (Collinge, 1901)
Camaenidae
 Aegista chejuensis (Pilsbry & Hirase, 1908)
 Aegista chosenica (Pilsbry, 1906)
 Aegista gottschei (Möllendorff, 1887)
 Aegista gottschei fusanica (Pilsbry, 1926)
 Aegista gottschei kyobuntonis Kuroda & Miyanaga, 1943
 Aegista proxima (Pilsbry & Hirase, 1909)
 Aegista pyramidata (Pilsbry, 1926)
 Aegista quelpartensis (Pilsbry & Hirase, 1904)
 Aegista tenuissima (Pilsbry & Hirase, 1908)
 Trishoplita pumilio (Pilsbry & Hirase, 1909)
 Lepidopisum verrucosum (Reinhardt, 1877)
 Karaftohelix kurodana (Pilsbry, 1926)
 Karaftohelix koreana (Pfeiffer, 1850)
 Karaftohelix adamsi (Kuroda & Hukuda, 1944)
Acusta sieboldiana (Pfeiffer, 1850)
 Satsuma myomphala (Martens, 1865)
 Euhadra herklotsi (von Martens, 1860)
 Euhadra dixoni (Pilsbry, 1900)
 Nesiohelix samarangae Kuroda & Miyanaga, 1943

Freshwater bivalves
Unionidae Rafinesque, 1820

 Cristaria plicata  (Leach, 1814)
 Anemina arcaeformis (Heude, 1877)

See also
Lists of molluscs of surrounding countries:
 List of non-marine molluscs of North Korea, Wildlife of North Korea
 List of non-marine molluscs of China
 List of non-marine molluscs of Japan

References

Molluscs
South Korea
South Korea